Calditerricola satsumensis is an extreme thermophilic, Gram-negative, aerobic and non-spore-forming bacterium from the genus of Calditerricola which has been isolated from high-temperature compost from Kagoshima in Japan.

References

External links 

Type strain of Calditerricola satsumensis at BacDive -  the Bacterial Diversity Metadatabase

Bacillaceae
Bacteria described in 2011